The Hobart Devils are a defunct professional basketball team that competed in Australia's National Basketball League (NBL). Based in Hobart, Tasmania, the team was the only representative from the state of Tasmania for the majority of its tenure, but was one of three teams (the Geelong Supercats and the Gold Coast Rollers being the other two) that had their NBL licenses revoked by the league directors in 1996 due to financial difficulties. While not the first time teams had pulled out of the league, the sudden departure of the Devils, Supercats and Rollers signified that the NBL's successful era (between the late 1980s and early 1990s) was truly over. Tasmania went unrepresented in the National Basketball League for 26 years, until the commencement of the 2021–22 NBL season with the inclusion of the Tasmania JackJumpers. The JackJumpers, a new state team, play half of their home matches at the MyState Bank Arena, affectionately called the "Devil's Den" by commentators and fans alike during the reign of the Hobart Devils.

The club played out of the Kingborough Sports Centre from 1983 to 1988. For the 1989 NBL season, they then moved into the larger (5,400-seat) and more modern Derwent Entertainment Centre where they stayed until folding in 1996. The move into the new arena gave the club access to a larger venue, but the Tassie Devils evidently left their "magic" at Kingborough, where they had been very hard to defeat, generally in the role of the underdog in seasons 1986, 1987 and 1988, with these three years played before sell-out crowds in the cozy 1,800-seat arena. During Devils home games, the home court arena was often referred to as the "Devils Den" by local TV commentators. The Devils were determined to shed the "easy beat" reputation and achieved a three season era of relative success,  topped by their most successful, and only winning season in NBL competition, in 1987, notching a 14-win, 12-loss league record. That team featured good chemistry and a high-powered offense, and included in the side: Steve Carfino, Paul Stanley, Jerry Dennard, Wayne Burden, Peter Mann, Dan VH Pelikaan, Murray Shields, Rick Hodges, and Paul Simpson whilst being coached by American Dave "Doc" Adkins and assisted by Pat Whalen, and ably led by club president, Tasmanian Wayne Monaghan, who moved the club's financial planning up from the chook raffle to some supportive local business sponsorships.

The club was known as Hobart Tassie Devils from 1987 to 1995, but reverted to Hobart Devils in its final season.

Imports in the Devils side included:
1983: Eric Bailey, Curtis Coleman
1984: Eric Bailey, Danny Adamson (cut mid-season, replaced with Aaron Douglas)
1985: Curtis Coleman, Ollie Johnson 1986: Jeff Acres, Steve Carfino
1987: Steve Carfino, Paul "Spike" Stanley
1988: Greg Giddings (cut mid-season, replaced with Kelvin Scarborough), "Jumpin'" Joe Hurst
1989: Joe Hurst, Kevin van Veldhuizen (cut mid-season, replaced with Paul Stanley)
1990: Dan Krebs, Steve Phyfe
1991: Jason Reese, Wayne Engelstad
1992: Anthony Welch, Ken McFadden (both cut, replaced by Joe Hurst and Donald Whiteside
1993: Donald Whiteside, Jim "Magilla the Gorilla" Havrilla (cut mid-season, replaced with Mike Kelly)
1994: Calvin Talford, Lamont Middelton (cut mid-season, replaced with Keith Nelson)
1995: Jerome Scott, Andre Moore
1996: Jerome Scott, Jonathon Robert

Hobart NBL Win–loss Coaching Records 1983-1996:
Doc Adkins     33-45
Tom Maher      16-36
Bill Tomlinson 16-64
Cal Bruton     15-35
Gordy McLeod    8-12
Danny Adamson  4-19
Keith Scott    2-20
Charlie Aamit  2-24

Honour roll

Season by season

References

External links

 
Defunct National Basketball League (Australia) teams
Sport in Hobart
Basketball teams in Tasmania
Basketball teams established in 1983
Basketball teams disestablished in 1996
1983 establishments in Australia
1996 disestablishments in Australia